The Cornwall League 1 2010–11 was a full season of rugby union within Cornwall League 1.

Team changes
Veor promoted as champions and Pirates Amateurs promoted to the Tribute Cornwall/Devon League, after beating Wessex (Tribute Devon 1) in a playoff. St Day, Perranporth, Illogan Park, St Agnes and Redruth Albany are relegated to the re–formed Tribute Cornwall 2. Lankelly–Fowey withdrew during the season and their results were expunged from the table; they will start next season in Tribute Cornwall 2 as well.

Table
 
Points are awarded as follows:
 4 points for a win
 2 points for a draw
 0 points for a loss
 1 point for a loss by seven points or less
 1 point for 4 tries or more

Play–off

References

External links
  Trelawny's Army

Cornwall
2010